Daniel Waters is a politician in Ontario, Canada. He served as a New Democratic Party member of the Legislative Assembly of Ontario from 1990 to 1995.

Background
Waters worked at the Bracebridge Alcan plant before 1990, and operated an auto repair and service shop in Baysville until 2006.  He now manages properties on Lakes Muskoka and Rosseau and lives on HWY 118 West.

Politics
He ran for the Ontario legislature in the 1987 provincial election, but finished third in the central Ontario riding of Muskoka—Georgian Bay against Liberal Ken Black.

The NDP won a majority government in the 1990 provincial election and Waters was elected for the riding on his second try. He defeated Progressive Conservative Marilyn Rowe by just under 3,000 votes; Black finished third. Waters served as a parliamentary assistant from 1990 to 1995.

In 1994, Waters was one of twelve NDP members to vote against Bill 167, a bill extending financial benefits to same-sex partners. Premier Bob Rae allowed a free vote on the bill which allowed members of his party to vote with their conscience.

The NDP were defeated in the 1995 provincial election, and Waters was defeated in his bid for re-election, finishing third against Progressive Conservative Bill Grimmett.  He ran for the NDP again in the 1999 provincial election, but finished a distant third against PC candidate (and future Premier of Ontario) Ernie Eves in the redistributed riding of Parry Sound—Muskoka.  In 2000, he unsuccessfully campaigned for a municipal seat in Lake of Bays Township.

After the 1999 election, Waters changed his affiliation from the NDP to the Liberal Party.  For the 2003 provincial election, he won the Parry Sound–Muskoka Liberal nomination over Evelyn Brown and challenged Progressive Conservative incumbent Norm Miller, who had succeeded Eves in a by-election.  Although the Liberals won a majority government provincially, Waters lost to Miller by more than 5,000 votes.

Electoral record

References

External links

Ontario New Democratic Party MPPs
Living people
Year of birth missing (living people)